The South Africa President's XV is a South African rugby union team that represented South Africa in the 2013 IRB Tbilisi Cup. They won the tournament, winning all three matches, but did not take part in the 2014 edition.

Previously, an Emerging Springboks team competed in the 2007 and 2008 IRB Nations Cup competitions.

History
The team was created following the IRB's decision to create the Tbilisi Cup, to be held in Tbilisi, Georgia in 2013.

The team consisted of players playing in the First Division (second tier) of the South African domestic Currie Cup competition. First Division players have previously been selected for South African Barbarians teams that played against England during the 2012 mid-year rugby test series.

2013 IRB Tbilisi Cup
Loose-forward Uzair Cassiem ended joint top try scorer with two tries, while fly-half Carl Bezuidenhout ended third in the points scoring charts with 25 points.

Squad
The following squad was named to compete in the 2013 IRB Tbilisi Cup:

Note: Marius Coetzer, Hoffmann Maritz and Joe Seerane were initially named in the squad, but were replaced by Eduan van der Walt, Stefan Watermeyer and Coenie van Wyk. In addition, Vince Gwavu and Inus Kritzinger were initially named, but not named in the final squad.

See also
 Emerging Springboks
 South African Barbarians

References

South Africa national rugby union team
World Rugby Tbilisi Cup
2013 in South African rugby union